Stormy may refer to:

Entertainment
 Stormy (album), by Hank Williams, Jr.
 "Stormy" (song), a 1968 song by the Classics IV
 Stormy (film), a 1935 drama starring Noah Beery Jr., also the title character played by Beery
 Stormy, a character from the children's TV show Rainbow Brite
 Derek "Stormy" Waters, a character in the American animated TV show Sealab 2021
 Stormy, a character(dragon) from the How to train your dragon cartoon

People
 Stormy Daniels (born 1979), American actress and director
 Stormy Kendrick (born 1991), American female sprinter
 Stormy Peters, free and open source software advocate
 Leon Stormy Rottman (1918–1993), American weather forecaster and TV host
 nickname of Roy Weatherly (1915–1991), American Major League Baseball player

Other uses
 Stormy Lake (disambiguation), several lakes
 Stormy (mascot), the mascot of Lake Erie College, Painesville, Ohio, United States

See also
Storm, a weather phenomenon